Saint Joseph University of Beirut (French: Université Saint-Joseph de Beyrouth, abbreviated to and commonly known as "USJ") is a private Catholic research university located in Beirut, Lebanon, which was founded in 1875 by French Jesuit missionaries. It is regarded among the top and most reputable academic institutions in Lebanon and the Middle East. Its alumni include numerous Lebanese presidents, ministers, judges, lawyers, philosophers, writers, scientists, intellectuals, artists, clerics and beyond. As Lebanon's oldest and main French university, it promotes Lebanese culture while openly disregarding ethno-religious affiliations during admissions and encourages a trilingual teaching of French, Arabic and English. Additionally, it is known in Lebanon and the Middle East for its university hospital, the Hôtel-Dieu de France, and for its prestigious and historical Faculty of Law, modern Lebanon's oldest law school and the first law school in Lebanon since the ancient Roman law school of Berytus, which itself was one of the world's first law schools.

The 12,000-student enrollment is served by an academic staff of 2,000 and a support staff of 540, distributed over its 12 faculties, 24 institutes and schools across five campuses in Beirut, with regional university centres in Sidon, Tripoli and Zahlé, as well as one foreign center situated in Dubai, UAE.

USJ is the only university in the Middle East to adhere to the European ECTS university academic credits system, while also being officially recognised by and in accord with the higher education law of Lebanon. It maintains some 150 various international agreements.

History

In 1839, French Jesuit missionaries came to Beirut and established a modest catholic school. Later, in 1855, the Jesuits founded a bigger school in Ghazir, which would later be moved to Beirut in 1875 to merge with the first school. Legal authorities quickly graced the new school with the title of "university", which allowed it to grant academic degrees, mainly doctoral degrees in philosophy and theology.

The creation of faculties and institutes followed the establishment of the university. For instance, the Institute of Medicine founded in 1883, became the Faculty of Medicine in 1888 and later the Faculty of Medicine and Pharmacy in 1889. A maternity clinic opened in 1896, followed by the Oriental College in 1902. The university has since been noted for establishing a continuous French presence in the eastern Mediterranean.

The School for French law was founded in 1913 and later became the Faculty of Law of Saint Joseph University in 1946. To this day, the Faculty of Law still teaches both French and Lebanese laws in a comparative approach with most of its major law classes being taught in French. The Faculty of Law enjoys a strong reputation in family law and private international law as well as in other areas of international law. Current law faculty members have contributed to the development of the law in France, Lebanon and Gulf countries and other regions of the world. The Institute for Political Sciences was first established in 1920.

The French School of Engineering also founded in 1913 became the Higher Institute for Engineering in 1948. The university launched Berytech, a business development center, in 2008. In 2012, the Faculty of Economics launched a new master's degree in web science and digital economy, the first of its kind in the Middle East region.

The university ranks very high for the quality of its publications.

Academics
Saint Joseph University currently ranks as the second best university in Lebanon, rivaling the nation's top English speaking American university, the American University of Beirut, as the nation's foremost French university, and among the top academic institutions in all of the Middle East.

University departments include: French Letters, Sociology and Anthropology (sociology, human resources management, information and communication), History (history, archeology, comparative studies and strategic research), Geography (tourist organization, environmental organization), Philosophy, and Psychology (psychology, education sciences). The University also has an Institute of Oriental Letters (Arabic and oriental letters, Arabic philosophy and history, islamology, education in Arab countries) and a Linguistics and Translation Institute. The degrees the university awards are: bachelor's (BA, BS, LLB, BEng, BBA, BTheol, BCS, B.Ed, BSA, BM, B.Phil among many others), master's, post-graduate, and doctorate. The University is also home to the Lebanese School of Social Formation, the Institute of Scenic, Audiovisual and Cinematographic Studies (IESAV), and the Lebanese Institute of Educators. The university has faculties of law, medicine, pharmacy, dentistry, nursing, and agronomy. The Social Sciences Campus (commonly known as "Huvelin" after its founder Paul-Louis Huvelin) is known for its competitive bachelor programs that prepare students to pursue advanced master's degrees in top business and law schools in France, Italy, Spain, Germany, the Netherlands, other member States of the European Union, the United Kingdom, the United States, Australia and Canada.

Additionally, it is known for its institutions such as CEDRAC and the Museum of Lebanese Prehistory. The university is home to the Bibliothèque Orientale, one of the oldest and most prestigious research libraries of the Near East, and a repository ancient valuable Oriental books and manuscripts. The business school has received an "excellent" ranking from Eduniversal.

Campuses

Saint Joseph University of Beirut campuses include:
 Campus of Medical and Infirmary Sciences, Damascus Street
 Campus of Science and Technology, Mar Roukouz
 Campus of Social Sciences, Huvelin Street, Rue Monnot
 Campus of Human Sciences, Damascus Street
 Campus of Innovation and Sports, Damascus Street

The three regional centers are located in Sidon (Southern Lebanon), Zahlé (Beqaa Valley), and Tripoli (Northern Lebanon). In addition, the university operates 12 facilities and 22 specialized schools and institutes, including the Museum of Lebanese Prehistory on Université Saint-Joseph Street. It also hosts a center for banking and business studies and three centers for dental care, speech therapy, and psycho-motility.

In 2008, Saint Joseph University opened a branch in Dubai, United Arab Emirates.

Saint Joseph University - Dubai offers a bachelor's degree in law (LLB) and a Master of Arts in translation. The campus is located in Dubai International Academic City. The university is accredited by the Knowledge and Human Development Authority in Dubai.

International cooperation
USJ has more than 350 conventions with foreign universities, most notably with Georgetown University in Washington, D.C., United States. It also has more than 200 professors on missions abroad and an administrative office in Paris, France.

The university belongs to the following associations and is linked to over 100 Arab, European, American, and Canadian universities through accords of cooperation.
 International Association of Universities
 International Federation of Catholic Universities (European Federation of Catholic Universities)
 Association of Jesuit Institutions of Higher Learning in Europe and Lebanon
 Association of French speaking universities
 Réseau d'excellence des sciences de l'ingénieur de la francophonie
 Association of Arab Universities

Notable alumni and academics

Lebanese Presidents
 Camille Chamoun
 Charles Helou
 Elias Sarkis
 Amine Gemayel
 Rene Moawad
 Bachir Gemayel
 Elias Hrawi
Lebanese Ministers
 Ziad Baroud
 Adnan Mansour
 Ibrahim Najjar
 Marie-Claude Najm
 Abdallah Victor Farhat
 Michel Murr
 Nicolas Nahas
 Tarek Mitri
 Khatchig Babikian
 Shakib Qortbawi
 Leila Al Solh
 Walid Daouk
 Marwan Hamadeh
 Salim Jreissati
Lebanese Politicians
 Raymond Edde
 Pierre Gemayel
 Samy Gemayel
 Michel Chiha
 Kamal Jumblatt
 Michel Pharaon
 Antoine Ghanem
 Fouad Abou Nader
 Nayla Moawad
 Karim Pakradouni
 Antoine Andraos
 Eddy Abillammaa
 Adnan Kassar
|valign=top|
Foreign Politicians
 Mohammad Habash
 Aram Karamanoukian
 Ahmad Mirfendereski
 Eliyahu Sasson
 Izzat Traboulsi
Religious leaders
 Anthony Peter Khoraish
 Peter-Hans Kolvenbach
 George Riashi
 Wladyslaw Rubin
 Michel Sabbah
 Nasrallah Boutros Sfeir
Theologians and philosophers
 Louis Cheikho
 Jad Hatem
 Samir Khalil Samir
Ambassadors
 Farid Abboud
 Tawfiq Yusuf Awwad
 George Ghanem
Academics
 Aya Chacar
Architects
 Joseph Philippe Karam
International lawyers
 Assad Kotaite
Poets
 Bashir Copti
 Mansour Eid
 Nadia Tueni

Linguists
 Joseph E. Aoun
Musicians
 Marie Keyrouz
 Joelle Khoury
 Gabriel Yared
Directors
 Nadine Labaki
 Hiba Tawaji
Historians
 Jean Maurice Fiey
 Henri Fleisch
 Paul Huvelin
 Henri Lammens
Columnists
 Georges Corm
 Randa Habib
 Peter Scholl-Latour
 Pierre-Luc Séguillon
Writers
 Charles Corm
 Hassan Kobeissi
 Amin Maalouf
 Wajdi Mallat
 Thurayyā Malḥas
 Youakim Moubarac
 Ghassan Salamé
 Salah Stétié

See also
 List of universities in Lebanon
 Paul Huvelin
 Rue Huvelin
 Education in the Ottoman Empire
 List of Jesuit sites
 Law school of Berytus
 Christianity in Lebanon

References

External links

 Official Saint Joseph University website
Instagram account
Twitter account
Facebook account

 
Catholic universities and colleges in Lebanon
Catholicism in Beirut
Jesuit universities and colleges
Schools in Beirut
Saint-Joseph, Universite
1875 establishments in the Ottoman Empire
19th-century establishments in Ottoman Syria
Organisations based in Beirut